York Racecourse railway station, also known as York Holgate Excursion Platform and Holgate Bridge railway station, served the York Racecourse in Holgate, York, England, from 1860 to 1939 on the York and North Midland Railway.

History 
The station was opened on 14 December 1860 by the North Eastern Railway. It was only used on race days. A cattle dock and a third platform were added on 25 September 1861. The sidings were used when the passenger numbers became too high, although this drew complaints due to delays and chaos. The station was last used for the races on 24 August 1939. Not much of the platforms remain.

References 

Disused railway stations in North Yorkshire
Former North Eastern Railway (UK) stations
Railway stations in Great Britain opened in 1868
Railway stations in Great Britain closed in 1939
1860 establishments in England
1939 disestablishments in England